The Keys was the quarterly journal of the League of Coloured Peoples founded in 1933. It took its title from James Aggrey's parable that used the black and white keys of the piano as an image of racial harmony. The journal ceased publication in 1939.

Notes

References
 The Keys: The official organ of The League of Colored Peoples. With an introductory essay by Roderick J. Macdonald. Millwood, NY: Kraus-Thomson Organization, 1976. . This reprint edition of The Keys contains volumes 1–5, nos. 1–4; vol. 6, nos. 1–2; vol. 7, no. 1.

Black British mass media
Quarterly magazines published in the United Kingdom
Defunct political magazines published in the United Kingdom
Magazines established in 1933
Magazines disestablished in 1939